National Highway 552G, commonly referred to as NH 552G is a national highway in India. It is a secondary route of National Highway 52.  NH-552G runs in the states of Rajasthan and Madhya Pradesh in India.

Route 
NH552G connects Jhalrapatan in Rajasthan to Ujjain in the state of Madhya Pradesh.
Rajasthan
Jhalrapatan, Beenda, Dawal - M.P. border
Madhya Pradesh
Rajasthan border - Dongargaon, Agar Malwa - Soyat, Susner, Agar, Ghosla, Ghatia, Ujjain

Junctions  
 
  Terminal near Jhalrapatan.
  near Susner.

See also 
 List of National Highways in India
 List of National Highways in India by state

References

External links 

 NH 552G on OpenStreetMap

National highways in India
National Highways in Rajasthan
National Highways in Madhya Pradesh